Statistics of Úrvalsdeild in the 1937 season.

Overview
It was contested by 3 teams, and Valur won the championship. Valur's Óskar Jónsson was the top scorer with 3 goals.

League standings

Results

References

Úrvalsdeild karla (football) seasons
Iceland
Iceland
Urvalsdeild